De blaa drenge (The Blue Boys) is a 1933 Danish family film classic directed by George Schnéevoigt and written by frequent collaborator Fleming Lynge with the score by Kai Normann Andersen. The film stars performer Liva Weel.

Cast
Liva Weel as Frk. Sylvia Grøn 
Robert Schmidt as  Rektor Elmquist 
Schiøler Linck as Religionslærer Zimmermann 
Mathilde Nielsen as Frk. Osterhammel 
Sigfred Johansen as Lærer Henrik Brandt 
Elith Foss as Adjunkt Møller 
Henry Christoffersen as Fysiklærer Meincke 
Harald Holst as Gormsen 
Petrine Sonne as Pige hos frk. Grøn 
Paul Hofman as Regissør Hannibal 
Henry Nielsen as Pedel på skolen 
Johannes Meyer as Oberst Barsøe 
Nina Kalckar as Ragna Barsøe 
Karen Lykkehus  as  Eva Kristoffersen 
Knud Heglund as Skuespiller Engel 
Svend Bille as Skuespiller Herman Sander 
Helga Frier as Skuespiller Lya Swanson 
Ib Schønberg as Oberstens oppasser 
Buster Larsen as Uartig skoledreng

External links
 
De blaa drenge at the Danish Film Database

1930s Danish-language films
1933 films
Danish black-and-white films
1933 drama films
Films directed by George Schnéevoigt
Danish drama films